Ahmed Tafiz Uddin is a Bangladesh Awami League politician and the former Member of Parliament of Pabna-2.

Career
Uddin was elected to parliament from Pabna-2 as a Bangladesh Awami League candidate in 1996.

Death
Uddin died in June 1998. His son, Ahmed Firoz Kabir, was elected to parliament from his seat in 2018.

References

Awami League politicians
1998 deaths
8th Jatiya Sangsad members
Pabna Edward College alumni
People from Sujanagar Upazila